Francis Yeoh Sock Ping  (born 23 August 1954) is a Malaysian businessman, and the eldest son of late Malaysia billionaire Yeoh Tiong Lay. He was appointed a managing director of YTL Corporation in 1988 and grew it into a multi-disciplinary conglomerate comprising six listed entities. YTL Corporation Berhad, YTL Power International Berhad, YTL Land & Development Berhad, YTL Hospitality REIT, Lafarge Malaysia Berhad and Starhill Global REIT have a combined Market Capitalisation of approximately RM29.1 billion (US$7.1 billion) and total assets of RM74.7 billion (US$18.2 billion). YTL Group owns and manages regulated utilities, real estate and infrastructure assets. 
Besides managing YTL Group's core listed entities, Tan Sri Francis is Executive Chairman of YTL Starhill Global REIT Management Limited, the manager for Starhill Global REIT. He is Chairman of YTL PowerSeraya Private Limited, which accounts for a 20% share of the Singapore Electricity market. He is Chairman of Wessex Water Services Limited, recognised as the best water and sewerage company in England and Wales (2010-2011) by the water industry regulator, Ofwat. He is also Executive Chairman of LaFarge Malaysia Berhad following its takeover by YTL Cement Berhad.

Tan Sri Francis is an Independent Non-Executive Director of The Hong Kong and Shanghai Banking Corporation Limited.

Ranked as one of "Asia's 25 Most Powerful and Influential Business Personalities" by Fortune and Business Week, Tan Sri Francis firmly advocates responsible stewardship in business. He serves on YTL Foundation’s Board of Trustees, actively supporting education initiatives throughout Malaysia. He also serves on the board of directors of the Suu Foundation, a humanitarian organisation committed to improving healthcare and education in Myanmar. In 2016, he was conferred the prestigious Muhammad Ali Celebrity Fight Night Award in Arizona for his philanthropic efforts.

Ardent advocate of ethical corporate governance, he is Founder Member of the Malaysian Business Council and Capital Markets Advisory Council, Member of Asia Business Council, Trustee of Asia Society and former Member of Barclays Asia-Pacific Advisory Committee. He is also on the Advisory Councils of London Business School, Wharton School and INSEAD. He chaired the judging panel of the Ernst and Young World Entrepreneur of Year 2011 in Monte Carlo, having been Ernst and Young Malaysian Entrepreneur of the Year 2002.

Tan Sri Francis is the first Non-Italian Board Member of the historic Rome Opera House and helped fund its restoration to keep it from closing. 

He champions arts enterprises like the Kuala Lumpur Performing Arts Centre and Singapore Dance Theatre, and is Regional Chairman of International Friends of the Louvre. He also promotes environmental conservation and renewable energy, serving on Nature Conservancy’s Asia Pacific Council.

In 2010, a panel of Nobel Laureates made him 'Primus Inter Pares Honouree' of the Oslo Business for Peace Award for encouraging socially responsible business ethics and practices. In the same year, he received the Corporate Social Responsibility Award at CNBC's Asia Business Leaders Awards.

Tan Sri Francis was made Board Member of Global Child Forum by His Majesty King Carl XVI Gustaf in May 2016. Global Child Forum is an independent, global multi-stakeholder platform purposed to dialogue, promote and advance children’s rights through ethical and sustainable practices.

In 2017, he was honoured with the Kuala Lumpur Mayor’s Award for Outstanding Contribution at the Kuala Lumpur Mayor Tourism Awards. This was in recognition of his efforts in the transformation of Kuala Lumpur into one of the top shopping and tourist destinations in the world.

He received the Lifetime Achievement Award for Leadership in Regulated Industries at the 7th World Chinese Economic Summit held in London in 2015 and he was named CEO of the Year at the Asian Power Awards 2017.

Tan Sri Francis was awarded the Commander of the Most Excellent Order of the British Empire (CBE) by Her Majesty Queen Elizabeth II in 2006 and upgraded to a Knight Commander (KBE) in 2019. In 2018 he was bestowed the Order of the Rising Sun, Gold Rays with Rosette by His Majesty the Emperor of Japan and in the same year the Italian government conferred upon him the honour of Grande Officiale of the Order of the Star of Italy.

He holds an Honorary Doctorate of Engineering, as well as a Bachelor of Science in Civil Engineering from the University of Kingston (UK). He also has an Honorary Degree of Doctor of Laws from University of Nottingham.

Tan Sri Francis married the late Puan Sri Dato' Paduka Rosaline in 1982 and they have 3 sons and 2 daughters.

Honours of Malaysia 
  :
  Companion of the Order of the Defender of the Realm (JMN) (1991)
  Commander of the Order of Loyalty to the Crown of Malaysia (PSM) - Tan Sri (1997)
  :
  Grand Knight of the Order of the Crown of Pahang (SIMP) - Dato' Indera (2001)
  :
  Knight Commander of the Order of the Perak State Crown (DPMP) - Dato' (1989)
  :
  Knight Commander of the Order of the Crown of Selangor (DPMS) - Dato' (1996)

Foreign honours 
  :
  Grand Officer of the Order of the Star of Italy (2018)
  :
  4th Class, Gold Rays with Rosette of the Order of the Rising Sun (2018)
  :
  Honorary Commander of the Most Excellent Order of the British Empire (CBE) (2006)
  Honorary Knight Commander of the Most Excellent Order of the British Empire (KBE) (2019)

Personal life
Yeoh is a devout Christian and has often attributed his success in business to Jesus. His successes and devotion has led to many Christians citing him as an inspiration. 

Yeoh married Puan Sri Datin Paduka Rosaline Yeoh in 1982 until her death in 2007 and they have five children. His siblings reside in Malaysia and are fellow directors of YTL Corporation. 

In 2017, Yeoh donated RM 8 million to charity in honour of his father Tan Sri Yeoh Tiong Lay.

References

External links
 YTL Corporation
 Tan Sri Francis Yeoh's Talks and Thoughts
 YTL Community

1954 births
Alumni of Kingston University
Malaysian Christians
Honorary Knights Commander of the Order of the British Empire
Living people
Malaysian billionaires
Malaysian businesspeople
Malaysian people of Hokkien descent
Malaysian people of Chinese descent
Malaysian chairpersons of corporations
Recipients of the Order of the Rising Sun, 4th class
Companions of the Order of the Defender of the Realm
Commanders of the Order of Loyalty to the Crown of Malaysia
Francis